Constituency NA-164 (Pakpattan-I) was a constituency for the National Assembly of Pakistan. After the 2018 delimitations, it has been merged into NA-145 (Pakpattan-I).

Election 2002 

General elections were held on 10 Oct 2002. Pir Muhammad Shah Khaggah of PML-Q won by 65,494 votes.

Election 2008 

General elections were held on 18 Feb 2008. Sardar Munsib Ali Dogar of PML-N won by 35,597 votes.

Election 2013 

General elections were held on 11 May 2013. Sardar Mansab Ali Dogar of PML-N won by 67,984 votes and became the  member of National Assembly.

References

External links 
Election result's official website

NA-164